"Pachuco" is a song by Mexican rock band La Maldita Vecindad. It was released in 1991 on their second studio album El Circo (1991).

Kumbia Kings version

"Pachuco" is a song by Mexican-American cumbia group A.B. Quintanilla y Los Kumbia Kings. It was released as a single for their live album Kumbia Kings Live (2006) on March 11, 2006. The song is a studio recording and not a live track. "Pachuco" is the final single by Kumbia Kings before their breakup in 2006.

Personnel
 Written by Lobito, Sax, Aldo, Pacho, Roco, and Tiki
 Produced by A.B. Quintanilla and Cruz Martínez
 Lead vocals by Fernando "Nando" Domínguez
 Intro by A.B. Quintanilla
 Guitar by Chris Pérez

Charts

References

1991 songs
1991 singles
2006 singles
Kumbia Kings songs
Song recordings produced by A. B. Quintanilla
Song recordings produced by Cruz Martínez
EMI Latin singles